Karsin is a former PKP railway station in Karsin (Pomeranian Voivodeship), Poland.

Lines crossing the station

References 
Karsin article at Polish Stations Database, URL accessed at 7 March 2006

Railway stations in Pomeranian Voivodeship
Disused railway stations in Pomeranian Voivodeship
Kościerzyna County